Santa Maria da Serra is a municipality in the state of São Paulo in Brazil. The population is 6,236 (2020 est.) in an area of 253 km². The elevation is 495 m.

References

Municipalities in São Paulo (state)